The Summer Mixtape Festival (simply known as the Mixtape Festival) was a major summer music festival launched in summer 2012. The first festival was held in Hersheypark Stadium in Hershey, Pennsylvania on August 17–18, 2012, featuring a number of icons and mainstream headliners such as New Kids on the Block, Backstreet Boys, Kelly Clarkson, The Wanted, The Fray, and LL Cool J. The festival featured two stages over two days.

The festival also featured fan events (for example Backstreet Boys' barbecue event "BSBBQ"), interactive exhibits, food trucks, celebrity and special guest appearances, and a spa oasis.

2012
The Wanted joined New Kids on the Block on stage in a performance of "Glad You Came" on August 17, 2012, and NKOTBSB brought out 98 Degrees to greet the crowd in the middle of their show on August 18, 2012. NKOTBSB also revealed that it was the last time they would perform together as they were going their separate ways after the festival. There was an additional event on August 19, 2012, called "Rock n' Jock". It's a softball game featuring New Kids on the Block versus Backstreet Boys in Harrisburg, Pennsylvania.

Line-up

Day 1—August 17
Kelly Clarkson
Carolina Liar
The Fray
DJ Cheapshot
Aaron Carter
New Kids on the Block
Steel Panther
DJ Pauly D

Day 2—August 18
NKOTBSB
LL Cool J featuring DJ Z-Trip
New Kids on the Block
The Wanted
The Dan Band
The Ready Set
Carly Rae Jepsen
98 Degrees

2013

Day 1—July 26
Train
The Script
OneRepublic
Rev Run with DJ Ruckus
Gavin DeGraw
Hanson
Serena Ryder

Day 2—July 27
New Kids on the Block
Jonas Brothers
TLC
Boyz II Men
Benji Madden
Emblem3
MKTO

2015
June 27
New Kids on the Block
TLC
Nelly
Vanilla Ice
Salt-N-Pepa
Sugar Ray

2016
August 6
New Kids on the Block
Paula Abdul
Boyz II Men
98 Degrees
O-Town
Dream
Ryan Cabrera

References

Music festivals in Pennsylvania